Botsfordioidea is a superfamily of Discinid brachiopods.

References

Prehistoric animal superfamilies
Discinida